Sol3 Mio (stylised as SOLΞ MIO) is the self-titled debut studio album by New Zealand musical trio Sol3 Mio. It was released on 15 November 2013 by Universal Music Group. The album debuted at number 1 on the New Zealand Albums Chart, and as of 7 July 2014, has spent sixteen non-consecutive weeks at number 1. It has since been certified 8× platinum by Recorded Music NZ for shipments exceeding 120,000 copies.

Background 
Sol3 Mio was recorded in London in 2013. It was produced by Nick Patrick and consists of 14 covers of opera, musical and popular classics, including two Christmas songs. The album was released on 15 November 2013 and has been certified 8× platinum by Recorded Music NZ for shipments exceeding 120,000 copies. Despite being released at the end of 2013, the album sold so well that it became the best-selling album of the year in New Zealand, beating out fellow New Zealand singer Lorde's Pure Heroine. The album also went on to become the second best-selling album of the year for 2014 in New Zealand, behind Ed Sheeran's x. In Australia, the album peaked at number 6 on the ARIA Albums Chart in 2014. In the UK, it peaked at number 44 on the UK Albums Chart.

Track listing

Charts and certifications

Weekly charts

Year-end charts

Certifications

References 

2013 debut albums
Universal Records albums
Sol3 Mio albums